Pyree is a farming locality in the Shoalhaven district of New South Wales, Australia. It consists of a community hall and grounds which host a local farmers and craft market on the fourth Sunday of each month.

References

Towns in New South Wales
Towns in the South Coast (New South Wales)
City of Shoalhaven